Christopher Wayne Goodison (born 23 September 1964) is an English former professional footballer who made more than 200 appearances in the Football League playing as a right back or midfielder. He is currently joint manager at Northern Premier League Division One West side 1874 Northwich, having previously been the interim manager of Ramsbottom United.

Career
Born in Wakefield, Goodison made 209 appearances in the Football League for Barnsley, Crewe Alexandra and Rochdale, before playing non-league football for Hyde United.

After retiring as a player, Goodison became an assistant manager, working with Trafford, Chorley, Salford City and Rossendale United.

He also had a six-match spell as caretaker manager of Salford City in October 2008. He joined 1874 Northwich as a coach at the start of the 2016–17 season, becoming joint manager in April 2017.

References

External links
Wayne Goodison's Twitter account

1964 births
Living people
English footballers
English football managers
Barnsley F.C. players
Crewe Alexandra F.C. players
Rochdale A.F.C. players
Hyde United F.C. players
Accrington Stanley F.C. players
Buxton F.C. players
English Football League players
Buxton F.C. managers
Salford City F.C. managers
Ramsbottom United F.C. managers
1874 Northwich F.C. managers
Association football fullbacks
Association football coaches